Adenoglossa is a genus of flowering plants in the daisy family described as a genus in 1976. There is only one known species, Adenoglossa decurrens, endemic to South Africa.

References

Anthemideae
Monotypic Asteraceae genera
Endemic flora of South Africa